Daniel Matheson may refer to:

Dan Matheson, Canadian journalist and news anchor
Danny Matheson, son of Ben Matheson in the American TV series Revolution
Daniel Matheson, owner of KCSG, a Utah TV station